The Radioplane OQ-2 was the first mass-produced UAV or drone in the United States, manufactured by the Radioplane Company. A follow-on version, the OQ-3, became the most widely used target drone in US service, with over 9,400 being built during World War II.

History

The OQ-2 was originally a small radio controlled aircraft model designed by Walter Righter. The design, along with its engine design, was purchased by actor Reginald Denny, who had demonstrated another model to the US Army in 1940. Calling the new design the RP-2, he demonstrated several updated versions to the Army as the RP-2, RP-3 and RP-4 in 1939.

In 1940, the Army placed an order for 53 RP-4s (some sources refer to the RP-4 as OQ-1. but that designation was never assigned). This small order led to a much bigger 1941 order for the similar RP-5, which became the US Army OQ-2, the OQ meaning a "subscale target". The US Navy also bought the drone, designating it TDD-1,  for Target Drone, Denny, 1. Thousands were built, manufactured at the Radioplane plant at the Van Nuys Airport in the Los Angeles metropolitan area.

It was at this factory on June 26, 1945 that Army photographer David Conover saw a young woman assembler named Norma Jeane Dougherty, who he thought had potential as a model. She was photographed in the plant, which led to a screen test for Norma Jeane, who soon changed her name to Marilyn Monroe.

Description and variants
The OQ-2 is a simple aircraft, powered by a two-cylinder two-cycle piston engine, providing  and driving two contra-rotating propellers. The RC control system was built by Bendix. Launching was by catapult only and recovered by parachute should it survive the target practice.  The landing gear was used only on the OQ-2 versions as sold to the Army to cushion the landing by parachute. None of the drones including the improved variants shipped to the Navy had landing gear. The subsequent variants delivered to the Army did not have landing gear.

The OQ-2 led to a series of similar but improved variants, with the OQ-3 / TDD-2 and OQ-14 / TDD-3 produced in quantity. A number of other target drones were built by Radioplane (including licensed contractors) and competing companies during the war, most of which never got beyond prototype stage, which accounts for the gaps in the designation sequence between "OQ-3" and "OQ-14".

After World War II ended, various experiment were made with Radioplane target drones.  In one experiment in 1950, a derivative of the QQ-3 Radioplane drone was used to lay military communication wire.

During the war Radioplane manufactured nearly fifteen thousand drones. The company was bought by Northrop in 1952.

Surviving aircraft 

 OQ-2 on display at the National Museum of the United States Air Force in Dayton, Ohio.
 OQ-2 on display at the March Field Air Museum in Riverside, California.
 OQ-2 on display at the Aviation Unmanned Vehicle Museum in Caddo Mills, Texas.
 OQ-2 or OQ-3 on display at the National Warplane Museum in Geneseo, New York.
 RP-5A on display at the Western Museum of Flight in Torrance, California.
 OQ-2A on display at the National Model Aviation Museum.
 OQ-2A on display at the Museum of the American G.I. in College Station, Texas.

Specifications (OQ-2)

See also

References

Sources

This article contains material that originally came from the web article Unmanned Aerial Vehicles by Greg Goebel, which exists in the Public Domain.

External links

 "The Radioplane Target Drone" a complete history of Radioplane in the World War II era.

1940s United States special-purpose aircraft
Unmanned aerial vehicles of the United States
Radioplane aircraft